The Palazzo Venezia or Palazzo Barbo, formerly Palace of St. Mark, is a palazzo (palace) in central Rome, Italy, just north of the Capitoline Hill. The original structure of this great architectural complex consisted of a modest medieval house intended as the residence of the cardinals appointed to the church of San Marco. In 1469 it became a residential papal palace, having undergone a massive extension, and in 1564, Pope Pius IV, to win the sympathies of the Republic of Venice, gave the mansion to the Venetian embassy to Rome on the terms that part of the building would be kept as a residence for the cardinals, the Apartment Cibo, and that the republic would provide for the building's maintenance and future restoration. The palace faces Piazza Venezia and Via del Plebiscito. It currently houses the National Museum of the Palazzo Venezia.

History

It took on a new layout in 1451, when owned by Cardinal Pietro Barbo, nephew of Pope Eugenius IV and the future Pope Paul II. It was a fortified building, composed of a half-basement and a mezzanine that functioned as a piano nobile, extending over a small area between the basilica and the gate of the present palazzo overlooking the piazza, with a small external tower. It was a building of no exceptional size but was sufficiently dignified as a cardinal's residence so that, even in 1455, Pietro Barbo could proudly boast of it, having a commemorative medal struck in its honor. In 1455, the building manifested some of the first Renaissance architectural features in Rome; although the overall aspect is of a massive, defensible medieval structure with battlemented crown. 

It was built around the medieval tower at the right of its facade and incorporated within its mass the ancient basilica church of San Marco founded by Pope Marcus in 336 and dedicated to the Evangelist who would become protector of Venice, completely rebuilt in 833, and which underwent frequent reconstructions since then. 

Much of the stone to build the palazzo was quarried from the nearby Colosseum, a common practice in Rome until the 18th century. The design is traditionally attributed to Leone Battista Alberti; the Venetian cardinal, Pietro Barbo, who later became Pope Paul II, was the patron: he continued to inhabit it even as pope. 

The project was continued after his death by his nephew Marco Barbo, patriarch of Aquileia. The green courtyard had only been enclosed by a colonnade surmounted by a loggia for less than a quarter of its full ranges before work was interrupted; the fully Renaissance design was by Giuliano da Maiano. 

The building became a papal residence, and in 1564 Pope Pius IV gave use of much of the building to the Republic of Venice for its embassy and for the titular cardinal of S. Marco, by tradition always a Venetian. 

From the Treaty of Campoformio (1797) throughout the nineteenth century, as Austria succeeded the defunct Republic, the building was the seat for the Austrian ambassador to the Vatican. In 1916, Italy, at war with Austria-Hungary, seized the building. It was subsequently restored. 

During the fascist period, Mussolini used the palace as his seat of government and private residence. From the balcony of the palace he addressed the crowd on many occasions, for example after the Ethiopian conquest or on Italy's entry of the Second World War. He undertook large-scale works to renovate the top floor into private apartments, setting up housekeeping for his wife Rachele Mussolini, his children and his mistress Clara Petacci.

On the advice of Achille Starace, Mussolini as a rule left the lights on in his office over night in order to cultivate an image of a workaholic totally dedicated to official business—"a man who never sleeps" as repeated by the propaganda.

It was at the Palazzo Venezia, in the Stanza del Pappagallo (Hall of the Parrot) where the fascist regime came to an end: a palace coup setting forth Count Grandi's Order of the Day demanding Mussolini's powers be taken away by the king. The vote by the Grand Council of Fascism left Mussolini in the minority, which enabled the king to dismiss and arrest him.

Present 
The Museo nazionale del Palazzo di Venezia, housed in the building, contains galleries of art, predominantly pottery, tapestry, statuary from the early Christian era up to early Renaissance.

In 1910, due to the erection of the Monument to Victor Emmanuel II, the Italian Government enlarged the Piazza Venezia and built a replica of the Palazzo Venezia in yellow brick on the opposite side of the square. This building hosts now the offices of the Assiscurazioni Generali di Venezia. Also because of that the Palazzetto di Venezia, which closed the south side of the Piazza, was dismantled and rebuilt southwest of the Palazzo.

In late 2010 Mussolini's unfinished "most secret" bunker was discovered beneath the building.

References

Sources

External links
Satellite photo The Palazzo Venezia is to the left of the Piazza Venezia's boat-shaped central lawns. The Palazzo's tower is exactly to the left of the "split" in the "boat". At the bottom is the white marble monument to Vittorio Emanuele.

Report of a Mussolini bunker discovered under Palazzo Venezia

Venezia
Renaissance architecture in Rome
Rome R. IX Pigna
Barbo family